South Africa is the southernmost country in Africa. It is the 25th-largest country in the world by land area, and with close to 60 million people, is the world's 24th-most populous nation.

The World Bank classifies South Africa as an upper-middle-income economy, and a newly industrialised country. Its economy is the second-largest in Africa, and the 34th-largest in the world. In terms of purchasing power parity, South Africa has the seventh-highest per capita income in Africa. However, poverty and inequality remain widespread, with about a quarter of the population unemployed and living on less than US$1.25 a day. Nevertheless, South Africa has been identified as a middle power in international affairs, and maintains significant regional influence.

For further information on the types of business entities in this country and their abbreviations, see "Business entities in South Africa".

Largest companies

Notable firms 
This list includes notable companies with primary headquarters located in the country. The industry and sector follow the Industry Classification Benchmark taxonomy. Organizations which have ceased operations are included and noted as defunct.

See also 
 List of largest companies in South Africa
 List of airlines of South Africa
 List of banks in South Africa
 List of restaurants in South Africa
 State-owned enterprises of South Africa

References